Soren Johnson (born May 23, 1976) is an American video game designer and programmer. Johnson's games primarily belong to 4X strategy, with a number of his titles having been critically acclaimed. He is best known for his work as a lead designer on Civilization IV, Offworld Trading Company, and Old World. He also worked on Civilization III as a co-lead designer.

In 2013, Johnson founded Mohawk Games, an indie studio in the suburbs of Baltimore, Maryland. They later moved to Alexandria, VA during the 2020 Coronavirus Pandemic. The studio brings together people he has worked with in the past, along with new talent, to create new intellectual properties. Their first game, Offworld Trading Company, was released to moderate critical acclaim.

Johnson is known for being one of the earliest developers who involved the internet gaming community in game design, testing, and discussion.

Biography

Early life 
Soren Johnson was born in Olympia, Washington to Kenneth and Ruth Johnson. He grew up in Centralia, Washington with his one sibling, Bjorn Johnson, and his cousins Kjell, Erik, and Sonja. At age 13, Johnson was offered the opportunity to go to college early, but his parents thought that he would benefit more from being around friends. In hindsight he has stated that he thinks his parents made the right decision.

His first ever notable gaming platform was a Commodore 64, which his parents bought for the family, when he was 7 years old . He grew up on mid 80's games, and electronic card games of the period, playing a wide variety of game genres, ranging from board games to strategy to shooter games and racing. Eventually he developed a particular interest in games that involved history and war. In particular he loved games made by renowned strategy game developer Sid Meier.

College and EA 
Johnson did not play a lot of games in college, choosing to fully embrace the college experience, resulting in him largely missing the experience of playing Civilization II at that time. Prior to college, Johnson was not aware that computer science consisted of learning programming until he first enrolled at Stanford University, where he started by acquiring a BA in History, and eventually a MS in Computer Science.

After college, Johnson started an internship with Electronic Arts, when a friend interning there got him an interview. During his internship at EA Johnson worked on Knockout Kings, developing its AI. Johnson returned to school for a semester at Oxford with his college roommate Christopher Tin. Tin would eventually be hired to work on Johnson's game Civilization IV, where he composed the Grammy winning song Baba Yetu. Johnson played the cello in the Stanford Orchestra, and at one point traveled to China to perform with his fellow Stanford musicians.

While in college, one of Johnson's friends, Ratha Harntha, won a bet he made with Johnson. The bet required Johnson to shave his head to give himself a mohawk. Johnson cites this as proving that while he might lose some challenges, he will honor his word. It ended up being the inspiration for the name of his current game development studio: Mohawk Games.

Firaxis Games 
After finishing his internship at Electronic Arts, Johnson started employment at Firaxis Games. Johnson followed the Civilization III development externally and jumped at the chance to join his idol Sid Meier. At the time he joined, much of the previous development team were abandoning Civ III, which was still early in its development. He considered the exodus an opportunity to help Meier and save the franchise from collapse. Johnson joined Firaxis in April 2000 and, along with Jake Solomon, started mid-development on Civilization III with director Sid Meier and designer Jeff Briggs. By this time only two engineers remained on the team: the intern and audio programmer. Johnson was offered his lowest salary to date, but persevered with an intention to use the experience to launch his career.

Eventually Johnson became co-lead designer alongside Jeff Briggs. Johnson had a lot of freedom to work on Civilization III and rewrote a lot of the code from scratch, even with only 16 months left to complete the work before launch. Johnson simplified Civilization IIIs code base so that a lot of new mechanics could be added, without having to simply keep building on top of the previous game. This was in contrast to the way Civilization IIs code was on top of the original. Johnson's hardcore resource features in Civilization III created scarcity in economic terms, becoming a catalyst for diplomacy system. Resource and economics systems would continue to be a key feature in his later games.

Johnson's main role during Civilization IIIs development, however, was its artificial intelligence. His success in this field eventually earned him a reputation as one of the best AI developers in the industry. Johnson's ideas, however, were not all well received. One infamous mechanic involved domesticated animals, such as horses, being limited to certain in-game continents - just like in real history. Rather than leaving these poorly received mechanics untouched however, Johnson headed one of the earliest examples of post release support in gaming, using the feedback from the gaming community to further update the game post release. Johnson further highlighted his community support by making the game modder friendly; designing the AI to adapt and continue to function with changes to game design, even during community modding post game release. Johnson provided updates and patches to Civilization III for a year after the initial release, spending plenty of time immersed in the game's community, judging and absorbing feedback. Many of the lessons he and the team learned from this exercise were later applied to Civilization IV, leading to great success.

Due to his success in Civilization III, Soren Johnson became the sole lead designer of Civilization IV, once again writing all of the AI. For Civ IV Johnson brought in Civilization fans and members of the gaming community to test the game ahead of release, which proved highly effective in making the game stable and balanced before release. This set the precedent for his future development process, and continues to be part of the formula for developing his games.

Johnson also had a considerable role in the development of the main theme music: Baba Yetu, by working with his old classmate and composer, Christopher Tin. Christopher and Johnson, wanted to capture the essence of the view of earth from outer space in a musical piece, but also giving a deeper feel to the song with an extra layer of lyrical meaning. The result was hailed as a masterpiece, being the first game soundtrack to win a Grammy. Some fans of Civilization IV reportedly ended up leaving the menu screen open just to hear the global beat on repeat. When Johnson was asked if Tin was 'as cool in real life as he is on Reddit' Johnson answered simply, "Yes."

EA and Zynga 
On April 17, 2007, it was announced that Johnson had left Firaxis to rejoin Electronic Arts (Maxis) to start mid-development on the genre bending game based on evolution, Spore. The game simulated 5 phases of evolution, starting the player as single cell and ending as an intergalactic civilization. Johnson was hired to help with the 4th stage: "Civilization" which saw your the player's procedural generated organism begin a primitive civilization on its home world.

Spore would end up to be a disappointment for Johnson due to the game's mixed reception from critics and fans. He later attributed its failure to a lack of a clear binding vision across all the teams, and the lack of outside player feedback. At EA, Johnson also worked on the design of Dragon Age Legends, a Flash game released for Facebook and Google+ in March 2011. Johnson left EA in September 2011 to join the social network game development company Zynga on an unnamed project that was never published.

Mohawk Games 
In 2013, Johnson co-founded his own game development studio, Mohawk Games, in the suburbs of Baltimore, Maryland. Their first video game launched April 28, 2016 titled Offworld Trading Company: an economic real-time strategy game for Microsoft Windows and OS X using an extended and more detailed version of his signature resource system first seen in his earlier Civilization titles. This game would be Soren Johnson's first use of Early Access, making changes to the game based on player feedback, even before its full release.

Offworld Trading Company is a unique game in the genre, as it is an economy-based RTS. Christopher Tin has again contributed musical pieces to the game, including the theme 'Red Planet Nocturne'. Once again Johnson and Christopher shared ideas on how to make the music sound "other worldly", with Christopher heavily synthesizing his music for the game. Offworld Trading Company would end up being a commercial success, selling over 600,000 copies, and achieved a broadly positive critical reception.

After the development of Offworld Trading Company, Mohawk started work on a new historical based Civilization-inspired strategy game initially called 10 Crowns. Due to financial complications with their publisher Starbreeze Studios (who originally financed Offworld Trading Company), Mohawk Games was offered a deal by Epic Games. The title received a name change to Old World after the switch in publisher, and the game was released on July 1, 2021.

Johnson was a bi-monthly design columnist for Game Developer and is on the advisory board of the Game Developers Conference. He also runs the game design blog Designer Notes and hosts the game designer interview podcast of the same name.

Personal life 

Johnson is married to Leyla Johnson, who works with him at Mohawk Games in a number of senior roles. They have three children as well as a cat.

Works

References

External links
Soren Johnson's profile at MobyGames
 www.designer-notes.com Soren Johnson's game design blog
Interview with Soren Johnson at CVG
Interview with Soren Johnson about social gaming at gamesindustry international

Place of birth missing (living people)
American video game designers
Living people
Stanford University alumni
Video game programmers
1976 births